Captain Lockheed and the Starfighters is a 1974 satirical concept album by Robert Calvert, the former frontman of British space-rock band Hawkwind. It consists of a mixture of songs and comic spoken interludes.

The concept was based on the German Air Ministry's purchase of the Lockheed F-104G Starfighter, which was eventually nicknamed Widowmaker by Luftwaffe pilots. In German service these planes had a poor safety record, with 262 out of 916 Luftwaffe Starfighters lost in accidents during the aircraft's time in service, which lasted from the early 1960s until the mid-1980s.

Musicians who appeared on the album include members of Hawkwind, The Pink Fairies, Brian Eno (although not credited as Eno), Arthur Brown and Adrian Wagner. The spoken sketches are primarily performed by Calvert, Viv Stanshall and Jim Capaldi.

"Ejection" (coupled with "Catch a Falling Starfighter") was released as a single, although both songs are slightly different versions to those on the album. "The Widow's Song" was included in the libretto and Calvert had hoped to record it with Nico singing. It wasn't recorded at the time but it was eventually recorded in 1984 with Calvert's wife Jill Riches on lead vocals and included on the Hawkwind, Friends and Relations Vol.3 compilation.

The album has been re-released in the late 1990s by BGO Records and is currently available on Eclectic Records (ECLCD1056) with bonus tracks.

Track listing 
All songs by Robert Calvert except where stated.

 "Franz Josef Strauss, Defense Minister, Reviews The Luftwaffe in 1958. Finding It Somewhat Lacking in Image Potential" – 1:40
 "The Aerospaceage Inferno" – 4:35
 "Aircraft Salesman (A Door in the Foot)" – 1:41
 "The Widow Maker" (Dave Brock, Calvert) – 2:42
 "Two Test Pilots Discuss the Starfighter's Performance" – 0:41
 "The Right Stuff" – 4:23
 "Board meeting (Seen Through a Contract Lens)" – 0:58
 "The Song of the Gremlin (Part One)" (Arthur Brown, Calvert, Adrian Wagner) – 3:21
 "Ground Crew (Last Minute Reassembly Before Take Off)" – 3:17
 "Hero with a Wing" – 3:20
 "Ground Control to Pilot" – 0:52
 "Ejection" – 3:35
 "Interview" – 3:55
 "I Resign" – 0:27
 "The Song of the Gremlin (Part Two)" (Arthur Brown, Calvert, Adrian Wagner) – 3:10
 "Bier Garten" – 0:38
 "Catch a Falling Starfighter" – 2:54

Bonus tracks 
 "The Right Stuff" (extended version) – 8.07
 "Ejection" (single version) – 3.47
 "Catch A Falling Starfighter" (single version) – 3.00

Hawkwind has incorporated some of the songs in their live set through the years including "The Right Stuff", "Ejection", "The Widow Maker" and "The Song of the Gremlin" and they have also been recorded and included on several of their live albums and compilations.

Monster Magnet did covers of "The Right Stuff" on their 2004 album, Monolithic Baby! and "Ejection" on their 2018 album Mindf***er.

Personnel

Musicians 
 Robert Calvert - vocals
 Arthur Brown - vocals on "The Song of the Gremlin (Parts 1 and 2)"
 Paul Rudolph - lead  and rhythm guitar (all), bass guitar on "The Song of the Gremlin (Parts 1 and 2)", "Hero with a Wing"
 Dave Brock - lead guitar on "The Widow Maker"
 Lemmy - bass guitar
 Nik Turner - saxophone
 Brian Eno (as Brian Peter George St John La Baptiste De La Salle) - Synthesizer and electronic effects
 Del Dettmar - synthesizer
 Adrian Wagner - keyboards on "The Song of the Gremlin (Parts 1 and 2)"
 Simon King - drums
 Twink Alder - Funeral drum on "Catch a Falling Starfighter"
 The Ladbroke Grove Hermaphroditic Voice Ensemble - backing vocals

Actors 
 Vivian Stanshall - most leads (e.g. Ground Control, Bright Mechanic)
 Jim Capaldi - American Salesman, Recruiting Officer, Dim Mechanic
 Robert Calvert - Pilot
 Tom Mittledorf
 Richard Elen (mis-credited as "Richard Ealing")

Recording 
 Technicians: Phill Brown, Frank Owen, Rufus Cartwright, Anton Matthews, Phil Chapman
 Producer: Roy Thomas Baker
 Studios: Island, Olympic, Radio Luxembourg (dialogue) between March 1973 and January 1974
 Mixing: Trident Studios

Sleeve 
 Concept: Bob Calvert
 Art Directions: Pierre Tubbs
 Illustrator: Stanislaw Ferdandes

References

External links 
 www.headheritage.co.uk: The Book of Seth review

1974 albums
Concept albums
Robert Calvert albums
Albums produced by Roy Thomas Baker
United Artists Records albums
albums recorded at Olympic Sound Studios